Jevgēņijs Kazačoks (born 12 August 1995) is a Latvian football player, who plays for Swedish club Nordvärmlands FF.

International
He made his debut for the Latvia national football team on 9 June 2017 in a World Cup qualifier group game against Portugal.

References

External links
 
 
 Jevgēņijs Kazačoks at SVFF

1995 births
Living people
Latvian footballers
Latvian expatriate footballers
Sportspeople from Liepāja
Association football midfielders
Latvian people of Russian descent
Latvia youth international footballers
Latvia under-21 international footballers
Latvia international footballers
FK Spartaks Jūrmala players
FK RFS players
FK Ventspils players
FK Jelgava players
OFK Bačka players
Oskarshamns AIK players
Latvian Higher League players
Latvian expatriate sportspeople in Serbia
Latvian expatriate sportspeople in Sweden
Expatriate footballers in Serbia
Expatriate footballers in Sweden